Arak University of Medical Sciences is an Iranian medical school located in Arak, Iran. This university is the main health care provider in Markazi province and one of the biggest universities central of Iran. The university was established by efforts of the director of regional organizations for Health in Markazi province and Majlis representative of Arak and authorities of Ministry of Health, Treatment and Medical Education. After getting the required permissions for the founding of Arak School of Medicine in 1987, and in February 1988 School of Medical Sciences commenced its activities with gathering the school of medicine and college of nursing and midwifery together with accepting 60 students in the medical field and was separated and did its activity independently in 1988.

In 1990, The University was converted to "University of Medical Sciences".

In 1994 with the inclusion of regional organizations for Health in the University of Medical Sciences, this university was named the University of Medical Sciences and Health Services, Markazi Province, and it took responsibility for offering health services in province.

Arak School of Medicine

The school began its activities with the goal of education and training for society's required physicians in 1986. Scientific and educational activities are divided into two basic and clinical sciences.
The school is active in area with more than 10,000 square meters and with welfare facilities such as laboratory, dormitory, library, computer hardware and software services, athletic space, etc. The school of medicine containing many hospitals which affiliated by Arak University of Medical Sciences including:

Valie Asr Hospital
Valie Asr Hospital is the main and biggest hospital in the Markazi province and one of the biggest ones in central Iran. This center was founded in 1950 and is one of the major medical centers that covers University of Medical Sciences in Markazi province, with 280 beds and 320 beds that are passed on to patients in emergency service. Also, it is active in the field of education and training in the fields of medicine, nursing, resident expert, etc.

Amir-al-Momenin(A.S) Education and Treatment Center
This center serves as one of the specialty and subspecialty in Iran and is founded with credit over 80 million Rials, 224 emergency beds, and 14 beds approved with area about 20,000 square meters in 2008. Overall, the hospital consists of three blocks: administrative, treatment, clinic blocks.

Emergency as an important part of hospitals consists of 14 inpatient beds, outpatient surgery room, CPR room and injections and also there is triage in this hospital.

The center has following wards including dialysis, dialysis, CSR, Para clinical wards (radiology, laboratory, pathology, endoscopy, colonoscopy, bronchoscopy, echo cardio graph, exercise, physical therapy), CCU, ICU, General practice including angiography, angioplasty, ICU open heart, open heart surgery, general surgery room, internal A (gastroenterology and general internal) and internal B (Endocrinology and Nephrology, Rheumatology). Angiography ward in Friday, October 30, 2009 and open heart ICU and open heart surgery in Friday, January 15, 2010 launched with efforts of all personnel and authorities, which is a big step in health level promotion and better treatment of patients in the province.

Amirkabir Education and Treatment Center

This center as the oldest hospital in Arak founded in 1939 in 5 specialty : ENT, pediatrics, cardiovascular, psychiatry with 220 approved beds and 247 active bed as an educational and treatment center affiliated to Arak university of Medical Sciences, is serving to patients. Also interns in pediatrics, internal ward, Anesthesia, are carrying out activities in this center. This hospital is equipped with the only MRI facility supported by government finances accepts other neighborhoods provinces.

Taleghani Education and Treatment Center
This center is located in west district of Arak city and at the beginning, it was founded with the name of Health & Treatment Center and after some years changed its name to Taleghani Maternity hospital  in 1967, and at this moment it undertakes its missions as Taleghani Education and Treatment Center with 98 beds.

Ayatollah-Khansari Education and Treatment Center

The hospital building was completed under the supervision of Imam of Arak's Friday Congregational Prayers at that time, Ayatollah Khansari, and with benevolent help in 1986; and construction project finished in 1996; and after, for a while has activity as clinical, the outpatient ward and  charitable and then it was closed for a few years.
The hospital was delivered to Arak University of Medical Sciences in 2006.
Imam Reza (A.S) specialized and subspecialized polyclinic
The polyclinic has officially started its activity since 2008. Now this polyclinic includes 23 active clinics and 5 para-clinics (laboratory, radiology, Audiometry, council and injections). Doing genetic tests at the province is other services that is offered in this polyclinic; and it has signed contracts with all major insurance companies.
Kosar specialized and sub specialized polyclinic
The polyclinic has officially started its activity since 2011. The polyclinic building consists of four floors, 14 clinics and 7 para-clinics. Clinic services including internal medicine, pediatrics, obstetrics, ophthalmology, ENT, orthopedics, dermatology, cardiology, general surgery, infectious diseases, neonatal, nephrology, neurology and physical medicine. Para- clinic including laboratory, pathology, cytology, ultrasound, hearing assessment, nutrition, thyroid assessment.

Arak School of Nursing and Midwifery
This school established in 1986 and absorbed students of Midwifery associate degree and Nursing B.S degree, also of Operating Room, Anesthesiology and Family Health of associate degree in 1994.
Anesthesiology and Family Health majors transferred to School of par medicine since 1997.
In midwifery major, associate degree became B.S degree since 2000.

EMS associate degree major began in the second semester 2006–2007 with capacity of 30 students, as semi intensive course. Now, Nursing, Midwifery and Operating Room B.S degree majors and EMS associate degree major is establishing in the school. ICU nursing MA degree also has been established in the school since academic year 2010–11.

Arak School of Health

School of Health established in 2010, with separation Fight against Diseases-Health, Family Health, Environmental Health and Occupational Health associate degrees from School of par medicine, base on sanction of the Cabinet at provincial trip in 2008, and began its activities independently; and Fight against Diseases-Health and Family Health majors of associate degrees became Public Health continuous BA degree, since second semester of the academic year 2010–2011.
History of health majors at Arak University of Medical Sciences goes back to 1998, with Fight against Diseases-Health and Family Health associate degrees. Added public health non-continuous and Occupational Health continuous BA degree in semester 2009–10, and Health Education MA degree since first semester 2011 to other majors of the school.

Arak School of Dentistry
Established in 2012 and has begun its activity by admitting 26 students which half of them are native students of Markazi province. Clinical Academic Groups:
Oral and Maxillofacial diseases, Endodontics, Restorative and Aesthetic Dentistry, Orthodontics, Oral and Maxillofacial Radiology, Oral and Maxillofacial Surgery, Prosthetics, Periodontics, Pediatric Dentistry and Oral Pathology.

Arak School of Rehabilitation

Arak University of Medical Sciences for training young and efficient manpower with the aim of providing services and improving individuals who suffering from mental disorders or physical illness have launched school of Rehabilitation in the Markazi province.
Educational groups:
Occupational Therapy major:
Occupational Therapy is a branch of Rehabilitation Sciences, which the therapist uses a series of activities, techniques, exercises, training, compensatory methods to realize the maximum potential of clients (who are mostly disabled people).
Audiology major:
Audiology major in the world dating back to World War II . In Iran also this course is relatively new in the area of Health. Audiology means the recognition and investigation in the fields of hearing. Now the major in Iran accepting students up to MD.PhD degree. Audiology domain consists of a set of measures in line with the prevention, evaluation, diagnosis and treatment of disorders of hearings and balance systems. The main branches of audiology are diagnostic, clinical, industrial, rehabilitation and educational branches.
Speech Therapy major:
Speech therapy is one of the majors of medical sciences which lead to a bachelor's degree. During this program students are familiar with speech and language and its role and importance in personal and social skills and learn communication development and its factors influencing.

References

External links
 Official website

Universities in Iran
Medical schools in Iran
Education in Markazi Province
Buildings and structures in Markazi Province
Arak, Iran
1987 establishments in Iran
Educational institutions established in 1987